The Johnstown District was a historic district in Upper Canada which existed until 1849.

Historical evolution
In 1798, the new Parliament of Upper Canada divided the territory of the Eastern District in two, which went into force in January 1800, and the following counties were withdrawn to form the Johnstown District:

The district town was originally Johnstown, but it was transferred to Elizabethtown in 1808.

The District's territory was subsequently reduced in several steps:

In 1822, Carleton County was withdrawn and transferred to the new Bathurst District.
In 1838, upon the creation of the new Dalhousie District, the township of North Gower and Marlborough were transferred to Carleton County, and the township of Montague, together with those portions of the townships of Elmsley and Burgess lying north of the Rideau River, were transferred to Lanark County.

Effective January 1, 1850, Johnstown District was abolished, and the United Counties of Leeds and Grenville replaced it for municipal and judicial purposes.

Further reading
Armstrong, Frederick H. Handbook of Upper Canadian Chronology. Toronto : Dundurn Press, 1985.

References

Districts of Upper Canada
History of Leeds and Grenville United Counties
1798 establishments in Upper Canada
1849 disestablishments in Canada